Jingzong are different temple names used for emperors of China. It may refer to:

Emperor Jingzong of Tang (809–827, reigned 824–827), emperor of the Tang dynasty
Wang Yanxi (died 944, reigned 939–944), emperor of the Min dynasty
Emperor Jingzong of Liao (948–982, reigned 969–982), emperor of the Liao dynasty
Emperor Jingzong of Western Xia (1003–1048, reigned 1038–1048), emperor of Western Xia

Temple name disambiguation pages